Luciano Gabriel Leccese (born 1 September 1982 in Salta) is an Argentine professional footballer who currently plays for Lupa Roma.

Career
He played on the professional level in Primera División A for Salamanca FC and Águilas Riviera Maya.

In August 2010, he was signed by Italian Seconda Divisione club L'Aquila.

In January 2011 he was signed by Fano.

In the 2011–12 season, Leccese plays with Eccellenza side Lupa Frascati.

References

External links
 
 Lupa Frascati profile 

1982 births
Living people
Argentine people of Italian descent
Argentine footballers
Argentine expatriate footballers
Expatriate footballers in Mexico
Expatriate footballers in Spain
Argentine expatriate sportspeople in Mexico
Argentine expatriate sportspeople in Spain
Salamanca F.C. footballers
Talleres de Remedios de Escalada footballers
SD Compostela footballers
L'Aquila Calcio 1927 players
Alma Juventus Fano 1906 players
A.S.D. Cassino Calcio 1924 players
Lupa Roma F.C. players
Association football forwards
People from Salta
Sportspeople from Salta Province